Laura Ludwig-Bowes (born 13 January 1986) is a German professional beach volleyball player, playing as a defender. Previously forming a pair with compatriot Kira Walkenhorst, she represents Hamburger SV and has won four European championships. She won the gold medal at the 2016 Summer Olympics. She added another medal, Gold, at the 2016 World Tour Finals in Toronto. In 2017, she and Walkenhorst won the World Championship in Vienna.

Biography
Ludwig was born in East Berlin, East Germany.

Initially paired with Jana Köhler, Ludwig won the U18 European Championship and later the U18 World Championship in Pattava Beach (Thailand). After surviving a stroke which nearly ended her career, she bounced back after teaming with a new partner, Sara Goller. Together, Ludwig and Goller became 2006 German champions, won the U23 European Championships in St. Pölten and ended up fourth in the women's European Championships the same year in The Hague. They continued their line of success in 2007, defending the German title and winning the silver medal in the European Championships in Valencia. Ludwig and Goller ended the 2007 season leading the German women's ranking and placing seventh overall.

She won silver medals at the 2007 and 2009 European beach volleyball championships, and gold medals at the 2008 and 2010 Beach ECH, alongside her former teammate Sara Goller. They competed at the 2008 and 2012 Summer Olympics, finishing in ninth place in 2008 and reaching the quarterfinals in 2012. 

In 2013 Ludwig formed a beach partnership with Kira Walkenhorst. The pairing was successful, with bronze medal finishes at the 2013 and 2014 European beach volleyball championship, and gold medals at the 2015 and 2016 Beach ECH. Ludwig and Walkenhorst won the gold medal at the 2016 Summer Olympics, defeating Brazil's pair of Ágatha and Bárbara in straight sets of 21-18 21–14 in the final.

World tour 2016
Laura competed in the World Tour Finals in Toronto. With teammate Kira they finished 3rd (Last) in Pool-B with 2 losses.
In the quarter-final match against Ross and Walsh they won in 3 sets of (21-18, 19–21, 15-11), advancing to the semi-final against Larissa and Talita of Brazil.

Winning against Brazil in straight sets of (21-19, 21-19) the pair advance to the gold medal match. Another Gold medal for the Olympic winners in straight sets of (21-18, 21-16) against the Swiss pair of Zumkehr and Heidrich

2017 season 
Laura Ludwig did not compete at the opening round of the 2017 season in Fort Lauderdale due to a shoulder operation. Ludwig's regular partner Kira Walkenhorst  temporarily partnered Julia Großner.

Laura's first tournament of the 2017 season after her shoulder operation was the Smart Super Cup in 
Münster. Alongside regular partner Kira they secured the gold medal with a 2:0 scoreline ahead of runners up Laboureur & Sude. Ludwig's first international tournament in 2017 was the FIVB World Tour tournament in Rio de Janeiro. After beating Lusson/Jupiter and Juliana/Carol in Pool play and Davidova/Shchypkova in their third match they lost to Pavan/Humana-Paredes to finish the tournament in 5th position.

2021 Season
In July, Ludwig partnered Margareta Kozuch to represent Germany at the 2020 Summer Olympics in Tokyo that had been delayed due to the worldwide Covid-19 pandemic. The pair reached the quarter finals losing to the Americans April Ross and Alix Klineman.

See also 
 Sport in Berlin

References

External links

 
 Ludwig/Walkenhorst website (archive) 

1986 births
Living people
Volleyball players from Berlin
German women's beach volleyball players
Beach volleyball defenders
Beach volleyball players at the 2008 Summer Olympics
Beach volleyball players at the 2012 Summer Olympics
Beach volleyball players at the 2016 Summer Olympics
Olympic beach volleyball players of Germany
Olympic gold medalists for Germany
Medalists at the 2016 Summer Olympics
Olympic medalists in beach volleyball
FIVB World Tour award winners
People from Treptow-Köpenick
Beach volleyball players at the 2020 Summer Olympics